The Radical Right in Western Europe: A Comparative Analysis is a book written by Herbert Kitschelt in collaboration with Anthony J. McGann.  It is a political science study of far right political party experiences in seven countries of Western Europe.

In the book, Kitschelt explores the rise of the new radical right parties in Western Europe. He claims that this phenomenon has taken place due to the shift in the political spectra in these countries. Kitschelt further distinguishes between three forms of new radical right parties: Neo-Fascists, which resemble the old Fascist parties and appeal to workers, NRR or new radical right such as the Vlaams Belang and the populist parties such as the radical parties of Italy.

It was published by University of Michigan Press in 1995; it was reprinted in paperback in 1997.

Awards
Winner of the American Political Science Association's 1996 Woodrow Wilson Foundation Award.

External links
The Radical Right in Western Europe at the publisher's page.
Book review of The Radical Right in Western Europe: A Comparative Analysis by Roger Eatwell in West European Politics,  January, 1998.

1995 non-fiction books
Books about the far right
English-language books